James Lee Donaldson III (born August 16, 1957) is an English-American retired professional basketball player who grew up in California and played 14 seasons in the National Basketball Association and several leagues across Europe. Born in Heacham, England, Donaldson played high school basketball for Luther Burbank High School in California before enrolling at Washington State University to play for the Cougars.

Amateur career
Donaldson, a 7'2" center, starred at Luther Burbank High School and Washington State in the late 1970s. In his 4 seasons at WSU he averaged 8.5 points per game and 8.1 rebounds per game in 84 games. As of April 2015 he was the all-time leader in career blocked shots (176), blocks average (2.1), single-season blocks (82 in 1977–78), single-season blocks average (3.0 in 1977–78) and single-game blocked shots (eight versus Stanford, January 25, 1978). He was inducted into the Pac-12 Hall of Honor and WSU's athletic hall of fame in 2006.

Professional career
After being drafted by the Seattle SuperSonics in the 1979 NBA draft he signed a contract with 3A Antonini Siena of the Italian Serie A.

Donaldson played three seasons with Seattle before moving on to the San Diego (later Los Angeles) Clippers. During the 1984–85 NBA season, he led the league in field goal percentage at 0.637—still one of the ten highest percentages in NBA history.

Donaldson cited Artis Gilmore, Darryl Dawkins, Moses Malone, Truck Robinson and Maurice Lucas as some of the strongest players he played against early in his career.

Donaldson joined the Dallas Mavericks in 1985. He joked with teammates that leaving the lowly, dysfunctional Clippers for the Mavericks was like dying and going to Heaven. He had his finest years while playing for the Mavericks, providing rebounding and shot-blocking to complement Dallas' star-studded line-up, which included Mark Aguirre, Rolando Blackman, Roy Tarpley, Derek Harper, Sam Perkins, and Brad Davis.  Donaldson himself earned a spot on the 1988 All-Star Team during a season in which the Mavericks reached the Western Conference Finals before losing to the Los Angeles Lakers. The NY Daily News named him the worst All-Star player ever after a fans voting. Sadly, things fell apart for the Mavericks generally in the late 1980s and early 1990s as their core group was either traded away (like Aguirre) or squandered vast potential via personal problems (like Tarpley) and Donaldson became the target for many fans and even his teammates for the franchise's woes, making the end of his otherwise hugely successful tenure in Dallas inevitable.

In 1990 he was founder and CEO of a dating magazine named Eligibles. It was published for a brief period of time in Dallas-Ft. Worth before going out of business. 

After brief stints with the New York Knicks (traded midway through 1991–92 for Brian Quinnett) and Utah Jazz (49 games in two seasons combined) in the early 1990s, injuries forced Donaldson into retirement from the NBA. He left the league in 1995, with 8,203 career points, 7,492 career rebounds and 1,267 career blocks.  He played in 957 NBA games without ever attempting a 3-point shot, a record among players from the 3-point era.

On August 1, 1993 he signed for Greek Basket League club Iraklis. He played in 30 games for Iraklis averaging 12.1 points per game, 12.2 rebounds per game and 2.2 blocks per game. In the 1996–97 season he played for Caja San Fernando averaging 3.5 points and 3.6 rebounds per game. He also had spells with Snai Montecatini (Italy, 1997–98, for only six games), Breogán Lugo (Spain, two stints, in 1998 and 1999) and Gymnastikos S. Larissas (Greek Second Division, 1998–99), retiring for good at the age of 41.

Personal life
Upon retiring, Donaldson settled in the Seattle area, where he ran the Donaldson Clinic, a physical therapy business in Mill Creek, Washington, until February 2018. He is also a motivational speaker.

In 2009, Donaldson ran for the non-partisan office of Seattle mayor and came in fourth among the candidates. In 2010, Donaldson joined the College Success Foundation as the Director of the Tacoma College Success Foundation.

In January 2018, Donaldson survived an aortic dissection.

References

External links

Former Sonic Donaldson ready for new challenge—ex-NBA, WSU player plans to run for City Council by Dan Raley, Seattle Post-Intelligencer, 7/8/08
Ex-Sonic James Donaldson in for Seattle mayor

1957 births
Living people
African-American basketball players
American expatriate basketball people in Greece
American expatriate basketball people in Italy
American expatriate basketball people in Spain
Basketball players from California
Candidates in the 2021 United States elections
CB Breogán players
Real Betis Baloncesto players
Centers (basketball)
Dallas Mavericks players
English men's basketball players
Greek Basket League players
Gymnastikos S. Larissas B.C. players
Iraklis Thessaloniki B.C. players
Liga ACB players
Los Angeles Clippers players
National Basketball Association All-Stars
New York Knicks players
People from Heacham
San Diego Clippers players
Seattle SuperSonics draft picks
Seattle SuperSonics players
Utah Jazz players
Washington State Cougars men's basketball players
American men's basketball players
21st-century African-American politicians
21st-century American politicians
20th-century African-American sportspeople